The 2016–17 Pro50 Championship was the fifteenth edition of the Pro50 Championship, a List A cricket tournament in Zimbabwe. The competition ran from 10 February to 6 June 2017. It was originally scheduled to start in May, but was brought forward to February in preparation for Zimbabwe's One Day International (ODI) series against Afghanistan. The opening fixtures replaced the scheduled fixtures in the Logan Cup, which were rescheduled for later in the competition. The Pro50 Championship restarted late in May 2017, following the conclusion of the Logan Cup.

Matabeleland Tuskers won the tournament with one game to spare.

Points table

 Champions

Fixtures

Round-robin

References

External links
 Series home at ESPN Cricinfo

2017 in Zimbabwean cricket
Pro50 Championship
Pro50 Championship